Shihmen Dam (also spelled Shimen or Shihman) is a major rock fill dam across the Dahan River in northern Taoyuan City. It forms the Shihmen Reservoir, Taiwan's third largest reservoir or artificial lake. It provides irrigation in Taoyuan, flood control for the Taipei Basin, and hydroelectricity and domestic water supply for more than three million people in northern Taiwan.

Completed in 1964 after nine years of construction, Shihmen was Taiwan's first multi-purpose water project and a major step towards the island's economic independence after World War II. Year-round water releases from the dam enabled additional rice harvests and doubled Taoyuan's annual agricultural output, while the reservoir became a major tourist destination due to its scenic beauty and plentiful fisheries. However, the project was criticized for its high cost and its impact on local communities, as more than 2,000 people were displaced to make way for the reservoir.

Like many other reservoirs in Taiwan, Shihmen has suffered from sedimentation, reducing its capacity by over a third. Efforts to reduce the rate of sediment accumulation, including dredging, check dam construction and watershed restoration work, have had a limited effect. This has diminished both the Shihmen Dam's capability to contain floods and provide water during droughts.

History

Background
The Dahan River is the main river in northwestern Taiwan and is one of two tributaries that join in Taipei to form the Tamsui, Taiwan's largest river system. Originating in the Xueshan Range, the river begins life as a fast-flowing mountain stream prone to flooding during typhoons. The Dahan skirts, but does not cross, the Taoyuan Plateau, which lacks a reliable water supply of its own. The plateau has been farmed since 1680 using thousands of artificial ponds to capture rainfall; in 1928, when Taiwan was under Japanese rule, the Taoyuan Canal was dug to divert water from the Dahan (then known as the Takekan River) onto the plateau. River water enabled the irrigation of an additional  of land in the Taoyuan area. Due to the limited storage capacity of the small Taoyuan ponds, there was often not enough water for irrigation in the November–April dry season, demonstrating the need for a large reservoir.

A dam at the "stone gates" (Shihmen), a deep canyon formed where the Dahan river exits the mountains, was proposed as early as 1938, but plans were dropped at the beginning of World War II with the strain on industrial resources. After the war, the Republic of China was faced with food shortages and a rapidly increasing population. By the 1960s, the annual population growth had reached 350,000. In order to improve its economic self-sufficiency, the government initiated the construction of Shihmen Dam, Taiwan's first multi-purpose water project. The Shihmen Development Commission was established to oversee the project. The initial budget for the dam was NT$1.4 billion, with approximately half of that as low-interest aid loans from the United States through the Agency for International Development.

Construction

Starting in July 1955, access roads and worker facilities were constructed at the dam site, and the area of the future reservoir was prepared to accommodate flooding. About 2,000 people (416 families) living in the Dahan River valley would be displaced by the project; they were relocated starting in 1956 to areas along Taiwan's northwest coast. Although the government built new homes, schools and other infrastructure as well as providing land compensation to families, the resettlement programme was the subject of bitter controversy.

The dam was designed by Tippetts-Abbett-McCarthy-Stratton, with construction overseen by Morrison-Knudsen (known previously for its work on Hoover Dam). Heavy construction began in late 1959 when large equipment arrived at the dam site. Although work was interrupted several times by typhoon flooding, the river was successfully diverted into a tunnel in December 1960. The concrete cofferdam, later to serve as the core of the dam, was finished in 1962; notably, it was the first use of roller-compacted concrete in dam construction. About  of nearby farmland were purchased by the government to provide  of earth and rock needed to build the dam.

With the dam only partially complete in May 1963, the diversion tunnel was plugged, allowing the reservoir to begin storing water. In July 1963, Typhoon Wendy struck Taiwan, causing massive flooding; the new reservoir was able to reduce the flood crest on the Dahan River by 25 percent. The embankment was topped out in June 1964, at a final cost of NT$ 4.85 billion. The dam was dedicated on June 14, 1964 by Vice President Chen Cheng, to a crowd of more than four thousand people.  A total of 7,500 people were employed in the construction of the dam, with as many as 6,000 workers on the site at one time. Thirty-two people were killed during construction; out of 2,881 injured, 87 were left permanently disabled.

Later history

Engineers estimated that the natural sedimentation rate would give the reservoir a useful life of at least 71 years without any sediment removal. However, just four months after the reservoir began filling, Typhoon Gloria struck Taiwan, and the resulting floods washed 19 million cubic metres (670 million ft3) of sediment into the reservoir – taking 23 years off its expected lifespan. As the reservoir filled, it also inundated several historic landmarks, including the former summer villa of Chiang Kai-shek, the Amuping Stone Bridge and a nearby Earth God shrine.

The annual crop was more than doubled due to an increased water supply for pre-existing farmland. Individual farmers' income rose by almost 20 percent. Despite the scale of the project, the increase in agricultural production was estimated to feed 500,000 people, or less than two years of population growth. The importance of the dam for irrigation has been decreasing since the 1990s as Taoyuan County saw significant urbanization; in the meantime, demand for cleaner domestic water has risen.

The government allocated NT$21 million to develop the Shihmen Reservoir as a recreational area. The reservoir would also be stocked with game fish, and its shores would eventually be developed with "temples, museums, monuments, pagodas, hostels and residences." After the dam was completed, it brought prosperity via tourism to this rural area, helping to diversify its economy from one solely reliant on agriculture. However, due to the project's high capital cost, the actual annual return on investment was only 1.5 percent: "It stands as an engineering monument of which the Chinese people may be proud. But it was purchased at far too high a cost in terms of tens of millions of dollars of alternative developmental opportunities foregone."

Dam details

Embankment and spillways
The main body of the dam contains some 7.06 million cubic metres (9.23 million yd3) of material.

The dam also has two additional flood tunnels which were completed in 1978, in order to allow faster evacuation of reservoir storage prior to typhoons.

Power station

The dam's hydroelectric power station is located on the left bank of the Dahan River at the base of the dam. Each generator has a capacity of 45,000 kilowatts (KW), for a total capacity of 90,000 KW. The plant produces about 200 million kilowatt hours per year.

Reservoir

The Shihmen afterbay reservoir, located below the main dam, regulates the water release into the Dahan River and provides the intake point for the Taoyuan and Shihmen Canals.

Operations and usage
Each year, Shihmen furnishes 181.6 million m3 (147,200 acre feet) of water for irrigation and industrial uses and about 127.4 million m3 (103,300 acre feet) for residential use in downstream areas. In addition, an annual minimum river release of 299.6 million m3 (242,900 acre feet) is maintained to provide a baseflow in the lower Dahan River. About 386.3 million m3 (313,200 acre feet) of the aforementioned releases are utilized for hydroelectric generation. The dam's power station generates roughly 200 million kilowatt hours annually and is integral in meeting peaking power demands in northern Taiwan's electricity grid. Hydroelectric power releases peak in late July and August, largely because of air-conditioning usage in Taiwan's northern cities.

Shihmen is one of several key reservoirs in the Tamsui River system used to cut peak flood flows during typhoon events. Dam releases are coordinated with those from Feitsui Dam to the east in order to reduce the severity of flooding. However, sediment accumulation in the reservoir has reduced its effectiveness on large flooding events. As a result, the "frequency with which the Shih-men Dam discharges water down its spillway ranks first among Taiwan's reservoirs. The phrase 'the Shihmen Reservoir is releasing flood water' has become a euphemism for 'your fly is open'." Additionally, large flooding events can cause turbidity levels in the reservoir to increase by over 3,000 times of average, forcing authorities to shut down water supplies. This problem has been exacerbated by the increasing percentage of Shihmen water going to residential and industrial users, who generally demand clearer water than the agricultural users Shihmen was originally intended to supply.

The reduction in storage capacity has also affected Shihmen's ability to provide water during droughts. Demand often exceeds stored water in Shihmen Reservoir during the dry season, forcing frequent water-supply cuts. For several weeks in 1994, the drought-stricken Shihmen Dam service area was limited to one day of running water in three. This has been further exacerbated by global climate change reducing the length of the rainy season in Taiwan, while increasing the intensity of rainfall when storms do strike the island. In 2015, Taiwan recorded its lowest winter rainfall since 1947, and the Shihmen reservoir fell to a record low of 24.5 percent of capacity, again forcing the government to enact water rationing.

Among the other benefits of the dam and reservoir is recreation. More than 160,000 tourists visit the dam each year, especially during floodwater releases. The reservoir, its surrounding recreation area and towns are visited by a further 1.7 million people each year. It is said that "after its grand opening to the public in 1964, the Shihmen Reservoir has remained one of the top spots on Taiwan's sight-seeing billboards".

Environmental issues

Poor land use and construction practices in the catchment area of Shihmen Dam have contributed to a severe sedimentation problem in the reservoir. This sediment mainly comes from landslides and other erosion-related issues in the steep, rugged drainage basin, which have been exacerbated by deforestation, land-clearing for agriculture, and the opening of roads into mountainous areas. The textbook The Hydraulics of Open Channel Flow by Hubert Chanson describes the dam as having "become a vast sediment trap with an inappropriate storage capacity to act as a flood control or water supply reservoir."

In 1981 it was estimated that 2.9 million tonnes of sediment flow into the reservoir each year, or a watershed erosion rate of 3,789 tonnes/km2. According to a 2017 Taipei Times report, the amount of sediment flowing into the reservoir was 3.42 million tonnes per year. About 1.17 million tonnes were sluiced through the dam's outlets and another 900,000 tonnes were removed by excavation and dredging. The government has proposed to construct a sediment bypass tunnel,  which would prevent another 640,000 tonnes from entering the reservoir. This technology has already been employed at reservoirs in Japan and Switzerland, and would essentially allow river water to be diverted around the reservoir instead of flowing into it during periods of high sediment runoff, such as after typhoons.

Sediment prevention projects

A number of measures have been taken to try and reduce the amount of sediment flowing into Shihmen Reservoir. Because of the construction of hundreds of sediment-trapping dams or sabo dams, the upper reaches of the Dahan and its tributaries are now among the most heavily impounded river systems in Taiwan, with at least 123 such dams along the main stem alone. The largest 24 sabo dams have collectively prevented some 36 million cubic metres (29,200 acre feet) of sediment from reaching Shihmen Reservoir. Only one, the Junghua Dam, is still collecting sediment, although its 16 million cubic metre (13,000 acre foot) capacity is nearly full. These sediment catching dams have also failed on several occasions causing even more debris and silt to wash into Shihmen. Among these was the failure of Baling Dam during Typhoon Wipha (2007), which caused 10 million cubic metres (8,000 acre feet) of sediment to wash downstream, destroying the village of Baling. Dredging efforts on Shihmen Reservoir have also been only partly successful. Beginning in 1985, seven dredging companies removed more than 10 million cubic metres (8,000 acre feet), but the reservoir continued filling with sediment faster than it could be excavated. The capacity of the silt disposal areas was exhausted in 1995. Other measures taken to decrease sediment flow include the construction of retaining walls and the reforestation of clear-cut areas.

In more recent years, the Taiwanese government has revived the idea of constructing more mega-dams in the Dahan River to increase water retention capacity and trap silt. This project could be built in conjunction with the Bilin Reservoir (比麟水庫) which would divert some water from the Dahan drainage to the Da'an River, increasing the water supply available for Hsinchu County. The dam projects have been strongly criticized as an expensive, yet only marginally effective solution to the problem, and for their effects on local communities.

Water quality
The large amount of sediment flowing into the reservoir has also caused unusually high nutrient levels, which leads to frequent eutrophication and algae blooms in the summer. As a result, Shihmen is often considered to be among the worst in water quality among all Taiwan's reservoirs. A large water-quality monitoring system is in place, installed circa 2005 at two points in Shihmen Reservoir. The turbidity, chlorophyll content, pH level, and dissolved oxygen levels in the reservoir are sent to the operator of the dam every three hours. A future plan for the system is to record algae growth, allowing action to be taken to prevent hypoxic events in the water. In 2008, the Taiwanese Environmental Protection Agency allocated NT$200 million for eutrophication control projects at Shihmen, Feitsui, Zengwun and Kinmen Reservoirs.

See also

 List of power stations in Taiwan
 Feitsui Dam
 List of dams and reservoirs in Taiwan
 Electricity sector in Taiwan

References

External links

Goodbye to Water Shortages?
Taiwan Water Resources Agency (in Chinese)
The View from Taiwan: Rain = Silt
What are the problems presently faced by the Shihmen Reservoir?
Current water levels at Taiwan reservoirs (Chinese)

1964 establishments in Taiwan
Dams in Taoyuan City
Dams completed in 1964
Hydroelectric power stations in Taiwan
Rock-filled dams